The Ogun State Executive Council (also known as, the Cabinet of Ogun State) is the highest formal governmental body that plays important roles in the Government of Ogun State headed by the Governor of Ogun State. It consists of the Deputy Governor, Secretary to the State Government, Chief of Staff, Commissioners who preside over ministerial departments, and the Governor's special aides.

Functions
The Executive Council exists to advise and direct the Governor. Their appointment as members of the Executive Council gives them the authority to execute power over their fields.

Current cabinet
The current Executive Council is serving under the Dapo Abiodun administration.

Principal Officers

Commissioners

Special Advisers, Consultants, and Assistants

Special Advisers

Senior Consultants

Consultants

Senior Special Assistants

References

Ogun
Ogun State